Lutz Wanja (born 6 June 1956) is a retired German backstroke swimmer who won a bronze medal at the 1973 World Aquatics Championships. He also won three medals at LEN European Aquatics Championships in 1974 and 1977. He competed at the 1972 and 1976 Summer Olympics in the 100 m and 200 m backstroke with the best achievement of fifth place in the 100 m backstroke in 1976.

After retirement, Wanja worked as a swimming coach and was involved in the East German doping program. In particular, Jörg Hoffmann admitted in 1988 that Wanja gave him the anabolic steroid Oral-Turinabol.

His wife, Barbara Krause, is a German former Olympic swimmer. Their son, Robert Wanja (born ca. 1983), is also a competitive backstroke swimmer.

References

1956 births
Living people
German male swimmers
Swimmers at the 1972 Summer Olympics
Swimmers at the 1976 Summer Olympics
Male backstroke swimmers
Olympic swimmers of East Germany
World Aquatics Championships medalists in swimming
European Aquatics Championships medalists in swimming
Sportspeople from Brandenburg an der Havel
20th-century German people
21st-century German people